East Montalivet Island and West Montalivet Island are islands off coast of the Kimberley region, in the state of Western Australia, in the Indian Ocean. They are often referred to together as the Montlivet Islands, although this is not a gazetted name.

They were discovered by Nicolas Baudin in 1802, and named after Jean-Pierre Bachasson, 1st count of Montalivet (1766 - 1823), peer of France and French statesman, in the atlas of his expedition.

The locations of the islands are:
 East Montalivet Island : 
 West Montalivet Island :

Further reading
Edward Duyker François Péron: An Impetuous Life: Naturalist and Voyager, Miegunyah/MUP, Melb., 2006, pp. 349,
 Fornasiero, Jean; Monteath, Peter and West-Sooby, John.  Encountering Terra Australis: the Australian voyages of Nicholas Baudin and Matthew Flinders, Kent Town, South Australia,Wakefield Press,2004. 
Frank Horner, The French Reconnaissance: Baudin in Australia 1801–1803, Melbourne University Press, Melbourne, 1987 .
Nicolas Baudin’s Scientific Expedition To The Terres Australes by Steve Reynolds - Marine Life Society of South Australia Inc.

Islands of the Kimberley (Western Australia)